Clarence Football Club is a former Irish football club based in the Belfast. It was founded in 1882 and was a founding member of the Irish Football League in 1890. The club resigned at the start of the 1891-92 season without playing any matches, having been unable to raise a team for its opening fixture. By the end of the 1891-92 season the club had folded.

The club was associated with the Church of Ireland Young Men's Society (CIYMS), and named after Clarence Place Hall, the then headquarters of CIYMS.

References

Association football clubs established in 1882
Association football clubs disestablished in 1892
Defunct association football clubs in Northern Ireland
Defunct Irish Football League clubs
Association football clubs in Belfast
1882 establishments in Ireland
1892 disestablishments in Ireland
Former senior Irish Football League clubs